Thomas Stanesby Sr. (c.1668 – 1734) and Thomas Stanesby Jr (1692 – 1754) were English oboe, flute and recorder-makers of the 18th century. Many of their instruments survive in museum collections around the world, and are widely copied by instrument makers of the present day.

English musical instrument makers
Duos
18th-century English people
Recorder makers
Flute makers
Oboe makers
Year of birth uncertain
1734 deaths